Tyler Conklin (born July 30, 1995) is an American football tight end for the New York Jets of the National Football League (NFL). He played college football at Northwood and Central Michigan and was drafted by the Minnesota Vikings in the fifth round of the 2018 NFL Draft.

High school career
Conklin attended L'Anse Creuse High School - North in Macomb Township, Michigan, where he was a standout two-sport athlete, playing as a wide receiver in football and combo guard in basketball. As a junior, Conklin led his basketball team to the Class A Final Four, scoring 22 points in a 59-46 semifinal loss to eventual state champion Saginaw High.

College career
After graduating from high school, Conklin was awarded a full-ride basketball scholarship to Northwood University. He stayed for one semester and played in seven games, averaging 2.6 rebounds, 1.9 points and 1.4 assists per game. However, midway through his freshman year, he transferred to Central Michigan University, where he walked on to the football team. Coming in weighing less than ideal for the tight end position, Conklin sat out his first season with the Chippewas in order to gain weight. After gaining 25 pounds during the offseason, he earned a backup role in 2015, catching six passes for 95 yards.
 
During the first one-on-one drill of training camp in August 2017, Conklin broke a bone in his left foot. He was cleared to return to the field on October 7 for the game against Ohio in which he set career-highs with 10 catches for 136 yards and two scores in a 26-23 victory.

Soon after graduating with a major in communications, Conklin received an invitation to the 2018 Senior Bowl in Mobile, Alabama, where he caught two passes including a 16-yard over-the-shoulder touchdown pass from Wyoming quarterback Josh Allen, whom the Buffalo Bills drafted at No. 7 overall.

Professional career
Conklin performed well at the 2018 NFL Combine and ranked second among all tight ends in the vertical, fourth in the broad jump, fifth in the three-cone drill, and ninth in the 40-yard dash.

Minnesota Vikings
Conklin was drafted by the Minnesota Vikings in the fifth round (157th overall) of the 2018 NFL Draft. On May 5, 2018, Conklin signed a four-year contract worth $2.741 million, including a signing bonus of $281,032. In the Vikings' season opener against the San Francisco 49ers, he had one reception for six yards in his NFL debut.

In Week 15 of the 2020 season against the Chicago Bears, Conklin recorded 3 catches for 57 yards and his first career receiving touchdown during the 33–27 loss.

New York Jets
On March 18, 2022, Conklin signed a three-year, $21 million contract with the New York Jets.

References

External links
 New York Jets bio
 Minnesota Vikings bio
 Central Michigan Chippewas bio
 Northwood Timberwolves bio

1995 births
Living people
American football tight ends
Central Michigan Chippewas football players
Minnesota Vikings players
People from Chesterfield, Missouri
Players of American football from Missouri
New York Jets players